Back o'th' Brook is a village in Staffordshire, England. The population for the 2011 census can be found under Waterhouses

Villages in Staffordshire